The 2015–16 season was Dunfermline Athletic's third and final season in the Scottish League One, having been relegated from the Scottish First Division at the end of the 2012–13 season. In addition to the league, Dunfermline Athletic also competed in the Challenge Cup, League Cup and the Scottish Cup, where they were knocked out by St Mirren, Dundee United and Ross County respectively. The club won the league on 26 March with five matches to spare, after defeating Brechin City 3–1 at East End Park. This, together with bottom side and Fife rivals Cowdenbeath unexpectedly beating the Pars nearest rivals Peterhead 1–0, saw Dunfermline return to the second tier for the first time since 2013.

Season review

May

8 May 2015: Allan Johnston is appointed as the new manager of Dunfermline, after it was announced that John Potter would step down from his position in charge of the first-team after the final league match against Airdrieonians and return to his previous position as a coach.
14 May 2015: The club announced that eighteen of the clubs squad were to be released after The Pars' failure to achieve promotion to the Scottish Championship. Among those released were vice-captain Gregor Buchanan, long-serving midfielder Ryan Thomson and full back Ross Millen. Manager Allan Johnston stated that he felt it was important to "freshen up the squad" after the disappointing campaign of the previous season.
26 May 2015: It was announced that after 10 years the Purvis Group would cease to be the club's main shirt sponsor, with a new sponsor to be announced before the start of the 2015–16 season. In recognition of the support provided and in order to continue the relationship which had lasted over a decade, The Pars stated that the Purvis Group would become their first ever "club sponsor", with the new sponsorship arrangement covering a range of areas such as advertising and assistance with stadium maintenance.
27 May 2015: Manager Allan Johnston appoints Albion Rovers assistant manager Sandy Clark to be his number two, marking the third time that Clark has signed with the club.

June
8 June 2015: Manager Allan Johnston makes the first signing of his tenure by bringing in Livingston captain Jason Talbot on a one-year contract. Of the move, Talbot noted that although he had moved down a division, he was looking forward to a "new challenge" with the Pars.
15 June 2015: Dunfermline make their second signing of the summer and their second signing from Livingston, bringing in centre back Callum Fordyce.
18 June 2015: English defender Ben Richards-Everton becomes the club's third signing under Allan Johnston, joining from Scottish Premiership side Partick Thistle. Additionally, the side returned to pre-season training.
28 June 2015: Former Aberdeen and Queen of the South player Michael Paton signs for The Pars. Paton, a winger, previously worked with manager Allan Johnston at Queen of the South.
29 June 2015: Dunfermline are drawn against Arbroath in the first round of the Scottish Challenge Cup, with the tie due to be played at Gayfield Park on the 25th of July.

July
2 July 2015: The club announce that SRJ Windows will be the new shirt sponsor, after agreeing a three-year deal with the business. This was seen as a continuation of the relationship which saw SRJ Windows constructing the clubs' "state-of-the-art dugouts", as well as having carried out other work around East End Park.
4 July 2015: The Pars' first pre-season match takes place against East Fife at Bayview Stadium. The side defeat The Fifers by three goals to nil, with the East Fife team being made up of five players who were signed with Dunfermline Athletic during the previous season. One of the scorers, Joe Cardle, appeared as a trialist having previously played for Dunfermline before being released during the financial difficulties two years previous.
6 July 2015: The side are drawn against local rivals Cowdenbeath in the first round of the Scottish League Cup, with the tie due to be played at East End Park on the 1st of August.
13 July 2015: Goalkeeper David Hutton is added to Dunfermline's roster, after appearing as a trialist in three matches for The Pars against East Fife, Partick Thistle and Livingston, successfully keeping a clean sheet in all three appearances. Manager Allan Johnston noted of the signing that Hutton should not expect to be first choice, as he was looking to sign another keeper, stating "It will be up to both [of] them to compete for the number one jersey, whoever is playing best will keep their place."
17 July 2015: Former Pars players Joe Cardle and Sean Murdoch agree to return to East End Park. Murdoch previously played for Dunfermline before joining Hamilton in 2008. Cardle was one of the first players released by the club in March 2013, after Dunfermline suffered a financial crisis.
25 July 2015: The first competitive match of the campaign saw Dunfermline defeat Scottish League Two side Arbroath 4–1 in the Scottish Challenge Cup, with Faissal El Bakhtaoui scoring the first of four consecutive braces in competitive matches.

August
1 August 2015: Dunfermline's first competitive home match of the season ended in a triumphant 5–1 victory over local rivals Cowdenbeath in the first round of the Scottish League Cup.
3 August 2015: After defeating Cowdenbeath in the first round, the Pars are drawn at home against Scottish Premiership side Dundee in the second round of the Scottish League Cup. Dundee's last visit to East End Park was during the 2010–11 season, with the result being a nil all draw.
18 August 2015: Defender Ryan Williamson suffers a double leg break in the closing minutes of the Scottish Challenge Cup tie against Forfar Athletic, after a collision with Forfar player Michael Dunlop.
20 August 2015: Following the victory over league rivals Forfar Athletic in the previous round of the Scottish Challenge Cup, Dunfermline were then drawn against Scottish Championship side St Mirren, with the tie to be played at St Mirren Park.

September
3 September 2015: Former Queen's Park defender Shaun Rooney signs for the Pars after appearing as a trialist for the side against Stranraer.
5 September 2015: Dunfermline complete the signing of journeyman striker Mickaël Antoine-Curier after he was released by English League One side Burton Albion.
12 September 2015: Faissal El Bakhtaoui wins the Scottish League One player of the month award after scoring twelve goals in all competitions, including five in the league. Pars Captain Callum Fordyce becomes the second Dunfermline defender sidelined with a long-term injury, after a challenge by Ayr United loanee Craig Moore left Fordyce with a broken bone is his fibula and a dislocated ankle.
24 September 2015: Former St Mirren centre back Marc McAusland signs for Dunfermline, in an attempt by manager Allan Johnston to bolster the side's defensive options after injuries to Callum Fordyce and Ryan Williamson.

October
10 October 2015: The Pars incur a heavy 4–0 defeat away to Scottish Championship side St Mirren, crashing out at the quarter-final stage of the Scottish Challenge Cup. Of the loss, manager Allan Johnston called it a "bad performance", commenting that it was "a chance to get into a semi final, a massive opportunity but we let ourselves down."
17 October 2015: Having signed for Dunfermline in 2008 and progressed through the youth sides, midfielder Shaun Byrne makes his 100th club appearance in a 3–0 win away to Stranraer. Defender Ben Richards-Everton scores his first ever professional goal on what is his 24th birthday, winning the man of the match award in a game broadcast live by BBC Alba.
29 October 2015: The third round draw of the Scottish Cup sees Dunfermline drawn away to fellow League One title contenders Ayr United in what is billed by many as the "tie of the round".

November

2 November 2015: To commemorate the twentieth anniversary of club legend and captain Norrie McCathie's death, Dunfermline launched a number of initiatives which would take place in the month of his death, January. These included the league match on 2 January 2016 against Cowdenbeath, the only other professional club which McCathie signed a contract with; an exhibition, celebrating the player and his time with the club; and a one-off "commemorative strip", replicating the final strip McCathie wore in a match against St Mirren at Love Street before his death on 8 January 1996.
5 November 2015: Pars keeper Sean Murdoch is voted Scottish League One player of the month for October, after the keeping a clean sheet in all four league matches for that month.
14 November 2015: Following the 2–0 victory over Airdrieonians at the Excelsior Stadium, the Pars went 612 minutes without conceding a goal in the league, breaking the record for total consecutive club clean sheets in the league which had stood since the 1985–86 season. The last league goal conceded by Dunfermline was also against Airdrieonians at East End Park in September. Although a club record, it did not break the record for a single Dunfermline keeper, with Ian Westwater having not conceded a goal in 617 minutes during the 1985–86 season.
21 November 2015: After not conceding a goal in the league in 632 minutes, the side managed to surpass Ian Westwater's previously held record, which had stood for thirty years. Josh Mullin of Albion Rovers was the first player to score against the Pars in seven league matches, in a one all draw between the two teams.
28 November 2015: In the third round of the Scottish Cup, Dunfermline defeated league rivals Ayr United at Somerset Park by one goal to nil. In storm-like conditions, a goal from stand-in captain Andy Geggan was what separated the two sides after 90 minutes.

December

1 December 2015: After defeating Ayr United in the previous round of the Scottish Cup, the Pars were drawn against Ross County, their third encounter of the season with a Scottish Premiership side, after matches against Dundee and Dundee United in the Scottish League Cup. Former Dunfermline manager Jim McIntyre, who managed the side for five years, returns to East End Park for the first time after being sacked in March 2012.
5 December 2015: Due to Ayr United's opponents Cowdenbeath taking part in a Scottish Cup third round replay, the Pars returned to the top of the table after defeating bottom side Brechin City. Goals from Faissal El Bakhtaoui, Michael Paton and David Hopkirk helped Dunermline to a 3–1 win at East End Park.
7 December 2015: The Scottish Disabled Supporters' Association (SDSA) recognised East End Park as being the most accessible football ground for disabled football supporters in Scotland. Managing Director Ross McArthur commented that the club were "delighted" to be recognised as the frontrunner in providing access to disabled supporters.
12 December 2015: The side defeated main rivals Ayr United at Somerset Park for the second time in two weeks in a 2–1 victory, putting them three points ahead of the Honest Men who had a game in-hand against Cowdenbeath. The Pars had to play for the majority of the second-half with only 10 players, after Joe Cardle was sent off for violent conduct for an incident with Peter Murphy.
17 December 2015: The club successfully appealed against Cardle's sending off against Ayr United, after it was made clear that Cardle had not struck Ayr's Murphy as referee Andrew Dallas had initially perceived. This allowed Cardle to take part in the following match against Stenhousemuir.
26 December 2015: The Pars finished 2015 with a 4–2 win over Forfar Athletic at Station Park, extending their unbeaten run to thirteen league matches.

January
2 January 2016: The Pars defeat Fife derby rivals Cowdenbeath in a match which commemorated the 20th anniversary of the death of former captain Norrie McCathie. Two goals from Michael Moffat saw the side run out 2–1 winners in front of a season high attendance at East End Park.
8 January 2016: Defender Brad McKay is signed on loan from St Johnstone for the remainder of the season, bolstering the defence after Marc McAusland suffered an ankle injury against Cowdenbeath.
9 January 2016: Dunfermline were held in a two-all draw in the Scottish Cup fourth round against Scottish Premiership side Ross County, with goals from Faissal El Bakhtaoui and debutant Brad McKay cancelling out strikes from Alex Schalk and Brian Graham.
14 January 2016: Manager Allan Johnston is awarded the Scottish League One manager of the month trophy for the month of December after guiding the Pars to four out of four victories, leaving his side 9 points clear of second place Ayr United. Collecting the award, Johnston warned other teams that none of the playing squad, in particular Faissal El Bakhtaoui, were leaving East End Park. El Bakhtaoui had received a great deal of attention from other clubs based on his performances for the Pars.
29 January 2016: The side suffered their first league defeat in 15 league matches, losing 0–1 against Airdrieonians at East End Park, with Diamonds midfielder Jamie Bain scoring the only goal of the match.

February
2 February 2016: After Marc McAusland left the club during the January transfer window, Allan Johnston signed former Queen of the South and Motherwell defender Craig Reid until the end of the season.

March
26 March 2016: While Dunfermline defeated Brechin City 3–1 at East End Park, second-placed Peterhead surprisingly lost 0–1 at home to Cowdenbeath leaving the Pars with an unassailable 13 point lead which saw them become the first club to win one of the major English or Scottish championships in 2016, with top scorer Faissal El Bakhtaoui also netting the first hat-trick of his career.

April
1 April 2016: Former Kilmarnock midfielder Scott Robinson signed a short-term amateur contract with the Pars, after impressing during a trial period for the club.
5 April 2016: Manager Allan Johnston and top scorer Faissal El Bakhtaoui both win their respective monthly awards for the month of March, with the side picking up 13 out of a possible 15 points and El Bakhtaoui scoring 6 goals in 5 games.
7 April 2016: Goalkeepers Sean Murdoch & Cammy Gill and defender Ryan Williamson become the first three players of the championship winning side to commit their futures to Dunfermline, signing new contracts.
30 April 2016: The final match of the season saw Dunfermline take on their closest rivals for much of the second half of the season, Peterhead. Fan favourite Joe Cardle scored the only goal in a 1–0 victory for the league champions. At the end of the match, the Pars were presented with the league trophy, after finishing 18 points clear of second placed Ayr United.

Squad list

Results & fixtures

Preseason

Scottish League One

Scottish Challenge Cup

Scottish League Cup

Scottish Cup

Squad statistics

Starting XI

Captains

Appearances and goals
During the 2015–16 season, Dunfermline used twenty-seven different players over forty-five competitive matches. The table below shows the number of appearances and goals scored by each player. Goalkeeper Sean Murdoch, centre back Ben Richards-Everton and striker Michael Moffat made the most appearances, each playing in forty-three of a possible 45 matches. The top scorer for the season was French Moroccan striker Faissal El Bakhtaoui, who scored thirty times in 40 appearances. Fan favourite Joe Cardle scored two hat-tricks during the season – against Forfar Athletic and Stranraer, whilst El Bakhtaoui's final home start before departing the club saw him score a hat-trick against Brechin City.

|-
|colspan="14"|Players away from the club on loan:

|-
|colspan="14"|Players who appeared for Dunfermline Athletic but left during the season:

|}

Clean sheets
Dunfermline used two goalkeepers in all competitions during the 2015–16 season. The table below shows the total number of shutouts made, with 18 clean sheets having been kept in forty-five competitive matches.
{| class="wikitable" style="font-size: 95%; text-align: center;"
|-
!width=15|
!width=15|
!width=150|Name
!width=80|Total
!width=80|Scottish League One
!width=80|Scottish Cup
!width=80|Scottish League Cup
!width=80|Scottish Challenge Cup
|-
|GK
|
|Sean Murdoch
|17
|15
|1
|
|1
|-
|GK
|
|David Hutton
|1
|1
|
|
|
|-
|
|
! Totals !! 18 !! 16 !! 1 !! 0 !! 1

Goalscorers

Assists

Disciplinary record

Club statistics

League table

Results by round

Results summary

Home attendances

{| class="wikitable sortable" style="text-align:center; font-size:90%"
|-
! scope="col" width=100 | Comp
! scope="col" width=120 | Date
! scope="col" width=60 | Score
! scope="col" width=250 class="unsortable" | Opponent
! scope="col" width=150 | Attendance
|-
|League Cup||1 August 2015||bgcolor="#CCFFCC"|5–1 ||Cowdenbeath||2,756
|-
|League One||15 August 2015||bgcolor="#CCFFCC"|7–1 ||Cowdenbeath||4,009
|-
|League Cup||25 August 2015||bgcolor="#CCFFCC"|3–1 ||Dundee||3,806
|-
|League One||29 August 2015||bgcolor="#CCFFCC"|3–1 ||Stranraer||3,330
|-
|League One||12 September 2015||bgcolor="#FFCCCC"|0–2 ||Ayr United||3,596
|-
|League One||26 September 2015||bgcolor="#FFFFCC"|1–1 ||Airdrieonians||3,391
|-
|League One||3 October 2015||bgcolor="#CCFFCC"|3–0 ||Albion Rovers||3,086
|-
|League One||24 October 2015||bgcolor="#CCFFCC"|4–0 ||Forfar Athletic||3,198
|-
|League One||7 November 2015||bgcolor="#FFFFCC"|0–0 ||Peterhead||2,915
|-
|League One||5 December 2015||bgcolor="#CCFFCC"|3–1 ||Brechin City||2,361
|-
|League One||19 December 2015||bgcolor="#CCFFCC"|1–0 ||Stenhousemuir||2,952
|-
|League One||2 January 2016||bgcolor="#CCFFCC"|2–1 ||Cowdenbeath||5,641
|-
|Scottish Cup||9 January 2016||bgcolor="#FFFFCC"|2–2 ||Ross County||3,439
|-
|League One||29 January 2016||bgcolor="#FFCCCC"|0–1 ||Airdrieonians||2,545
|-
|League One||13 February 2016||bgcolor="#CCFFCC"|3–2 ||Ayr United||3,319
|-
|League One||27 February 2016||bgcolor="#CCFFCC"|6–1 ||Stranraer||3,016
|-
|League One||5 March 2016||bgcolor="#CCFFCC"|5–0 ||Stenhousemuir||3,017
|-
|League One||8 March 2016||bgcolor="#FFFFCC"|1–1 ||Albion Rovers||2,729
|-
|League One||26 March 2016||bgcolor="#CCFFCC"|3–1 ||Brechin City||4,402
|-
|League One||9 April 2016||bgcolor="#FFFFCC"|2–2 ||Forfar Athletic||3,201
|-
|League One||30 April 2016||bgcolor="#CCFFCC"|1–0 ||Peterhead||6,236
|-
|bgcolor="#C0C0C0"|
|bgcolor="#C0C0C0"|
|bgcolor="#C0C0C0"|
| Total attendance:
|72,845
|-
|bgcolor="#C0C0C0"|
|bgcolor="#C0C0C0"|
|bgcolor="#C0C0C0"|
| Average total attendance:
|3,468
|-
|bgcolor="#C0C0C0"|
|bgcolor="#C0C0C0"|
|bgcolor="#C0C0C0"|
| Total league attendance:
|62,944
|-
|bgcolor="#C0C0C0"|
|bgcolor="#C0C0C0"|
|bgcolor="#C0C0C0"|
| Average league attendance:
|3,496

Awards

Scottish League One Manager of the Month award

Scottish League One Player of the Month award

End-of-season awards

PFA Scotland

Club

Transfers

First team

Players in

Players out

Loans in

Loans out

Development squad

Players in

Players out

Notes

References

Dunfermline Athletic F.C. seasons
Dunfermline Athletic